Alvin H. Culver (March 9, 1873 – July 17, 1955) was an American football player and coach.  He served as the third head football coach at Northwestern University, coaching two seasons from 1895 to 1896 and compiling a record of 12–6–2. From 1892 to 1893, he also played college football, while attending the school. In 1894, he played for the Chicago Athletic Association alongside future Northwestern coach, Jesse Van Doozer, who had briefly dropped out of college to play one season with the team.

Head coaching record

References

1873 births
1955 deaths
19th-century players of American football
Chicago Athletic Association players
Northwestern Wildcats football coaches
Northwestern Wildcats football players
Sportspeople from Chicago
Players of American football from Chicago